Patoka Township may refer to:

Illinois
 Patoka Township, Marion County, Illinois

Indiana
 Patoka Township, Crawford County, Indiana
 Patoka Township, Dubois County, Indiana
 Patoka Township, Gibson County, Indiana
 Patoka Township, Pike County, Indiana

Township name disambiguation pages